Peter Stephens (16 May 1879 – 13 December 1946) was an Australian rules footballer who played with Geelong in the Victorian Football League (VFL).

Stephens was recruited from Queenscliff and played mainly as a defender, but was also used as a ruck-rover during his seven seasons at Geelong.

References

External links

1879 births
Australian rules footballers from Victoria (Australia)
Geelong Football Club players
1946 deaths